Disenchantment is the cultural rationalization and devaluation of religion in society.

Disenchantment may also refer to:

 Disenchantment (TV series), a 2018 animated series
Disenchantment: The Guardian and Israel, a 2004 book by Daphna Baram
El desencanto (The Disenchantment), a 1976 Spanish film directed by Jaime Chávarri

See also 
 Disenchantment Bay
 Disenchanted (disambiguation)